"A Stash from the Past" is the fourth episode of the sixth season of American sitcom Roseanne, which aired October 5, 1993 on ABC. Molly Eischel of The A.V. Club described it as "the show’s screwed-up version of a very special episode".

"A Stash from the Past" is a fan-favorite and is often considered one of the best episodes of the series. In 2012, star Roseanne Barr named it one of her twelve favorite episodes. The episode was ranked No. 21 on TV Guide's 100 Greatest Episodes of All-Time in 1997. In 2009, it moved to No. 33.

Plot
While cleaning David's room, Roseanne is furious to find a small bag of marijuana. Meanwhile, Dan is unable to bring himself to discipline an employee who takes advantage of his good nature. By way of example, Roseanne allows Dan to watch while she sternly chastises David for bringing drugs under their roof.

It is not until David leaves that Dan informs Roseanne that the marijuana belongs to them, a stash they neglected to throw out twenty years ago when they gave up smoking due to Roseanne's pregnancy with Becky. Dan and Roseanne lament that they have grown up to be the authority figures against which they once rebelled. In a fit of nostalgia, they decide to smoke a joint while the kids are out of the house. Joined by Jackie, the three lock themselves in the bathroom and get high, but the experience is no fun as their sense of adult responsibility is too strong to allow them to relax.

The following morning as Roseanne, Dan, and Jackie recover, David summons the courage to tell Roseanne that the pot wasn't his, but the three adults are too hungover to respond.

Critical reception
Phil Dyess-Nugent of The A.V. Club noted the episode's resonance in the context of the time period, an era in which those who grew up during the sexual revolution of the '60s now had to deal with the responsibilities of parenthood:

Molly Eichel of The A.V. Club said one of the main appeals of the episode is that the drug-theme "feels so real...like a lived-in experience for these people", adding that "all of that humor is character-based" rather than caricature. The site's Genevieve Koski noted "Pot seems a lot less fun the older you get and the more responsibilities you take on." InsidePulse wrote that the episode "is considered one of the best episodes of the series", while The Cannabist deemed it "one of the all-time great episodes of Roseanne. Robert David Sullivan ranked it  no. 81 in his "Top 100 Sitcom Episodes of All Time" list. Splitsider called it "one of television’s most honestly and hilariously handled pot-based family sitcom episodes". Marillow.com ranked it the third in their "Best Marijuana-Based Episodes in Television History." Roseanne Barr listed it as one of her 12 favorite episodes of the show, calling it "hilarious and subversive".

References

1993 American television episodes
Roseanne episodes
American television episodes about cannabis